The Murphy River is a  river in Baraga County on the Upper Peninsula of Michigan in the United States. It is a tributary of Worm Lake, the outlet of which is the Rock River, which flows to the Sturgeon River and eventually to Lake Superior.

See also
List of rivers of Michigan

References

Michigan  Streamflow Data from the USGS

Rivers of Michigan
Rivers of Baraga County, Michigan
Tributaries of Lake Superior